Jimmy Paterson (25 February 1870 – 18 January 1927) was an Australian rules footballer who played with South Melbourne in the Victorian Football League (VFL).

Notes

External links 

1870 births
1927 deaths
Australian rules footballers from Victoria (Australia)
Sydney Swans players